The 1931 Drake Bulldogs football team was an American football team that represented Drake University in the Missouri Valley Conference (MVC) during the 1931 college football season. In its 11th season under head coach Ossie Solem, the team compiled a 5–6 record (3–0 against MVC opponents), won the MVC championship, and was outscored by a total of 226 to 130.

Schedule

References

Drake
Drake Bulldogs football seasons
Missouri Valley Conference football champion seasons
Drake Bulldogs football